Luca Caldirola (born 1 February 1991) is an Italian professional footballer who plays as a defender for  club Monza. Mainly a centre-back, he can also play as a left-back.

Club career

Inter Milan

2009–10 season
Caldirola started his career at Inter Milan, where he was the team captain at under-20 level (Primavera) and was occasionally called up to join the first team during the 2009–10 season, without making any appearances, however, on the pitch. Caldirola also played for various youth teams in Lombardy as goalkeeper and midfielder before joined Inter at the age of eight. He played in a friendly match for the Inter first team in 2009.

2010–11 season
On 29 June 2010, Inter loaned out Caldirola to Dutch club Vitesse Arnhem of the Eredivisie for the entire 2010–11 season; he is the second Italian player to be part of the Arnhem club, after Marco De Marchi. Inter also reduced the age limit of its Primavera team to under-19 in 2010, keeping only three players born in 1991 in the 2010–11 season as back-ups for the first team.

Half of the registration rights of Caldirola — and Luca Garritano — were sold to Cesena as part of the deal that brought defender Yuto Nagatomo to the San Siro in June 2011, after a successful loan. Half of the registration rights of Caldirola was valued €2.5 million; Caldirola signed a four-year contract. Both Caldirola and Garritano returned to Inter in a temporary deal for the 2011–12 season.

2011–12 season

On 7 December 2011, Caldirola made his first team debut for Inter in a UEFA Champions League group stage match against CSKA Moscow which ended in a 2–1 loss at San Siro.

On 4 January 2012, Inter confirmed that Caldirola signed a loan deal until the end of the season with the Serie B outfit Brescia.

2012–13 season
In June 2012, the co-ownership deal was renewed and Caldirola reported to Cesena in pre-season on 10 July 2012, where he played the first half of the season for the Romagna club before again being loaned to Brescia in January 2013, where he finished the campaign with 15 league appearances.

In June 2013 Inter bought back Caldirola for €2.5 million, with Riccardo Melgrati and Thomas Pedrabissi moved to Cesena outright for €750,000 and €1 million respectively; Cesena also signed Yago Del Piero in co-ownership deal for €250,000, thus the deals only involves €500,000 cash to Cesena.

Werder Bremen
On 26 June 2013, SV Werder Bremen confirmed the signing of Luca Caldirola from Inter on a four-year contract, for a €2.5 million transfer fee.

He missed most of the 2016–17 season due to injuries. With his contract running out at the end of the month, he agreed to a two-year contract extension on 15 June 2017.

After an envisaged transfer away from the club did not materialise in summer 2018, Caldirola trained with Werder Bremen's reserves in the first half of the 2018–19 season.

Darmstadt 98 (loan)
On 15 July 2015, Caldirola was loaned out for a season to SV Darmstadt 98.

Benevento
On 30 January 2019, Caldirola joined Italian Serie B side Benevento on a free transfer, returning to Italy after five years.

Monza
On 17 July 2021, Caldirola moved to Monza in the Serie B on a two-year contract.

International career
Caldirola has represented his native country of Italy at all youth levels, from under-16 to under-20.

On 17 November 2010, he made his debut with the Italy under-21 team in a friendly match against Turkey in a 2–1 victory played in Fermo.

In 2009, he participated at the UEFA Under-19 Championship with the Italians.

In May 2011, he was called-on by Ciro Ferrara to play the games of the 2011 Toulon Tournament. Under the management of Devis Mangia, in 2012, Caldirola was named captain of the under-21 side, where he led the Azzurini in the 2013 UEFA European Under-21 Football Championship.

Career statistics

Club

References

External links

 
 Profile at A.C. Monza
 
 

1991 births
Living people
People from Desio
Italian footballers
Association football defenders
Serie A players
Serie B players
Eredivisie players
Bundesliga players
3. Liga players
Inter Milan players
SBV Vitesse players
Brescia Calcio players
A.C. Cesena players
SV Werder Bremen players
SV Werder Bremen II players
SV Darmstadt 98 players
Benevento Calcio players
A.C. Monza players
Italy youth international footballers
Italy under-21 international footballers
Italian expatriate footballers
Italian expatriate sportspeople in the Netherlands
Italian expatriate sportspeople in Germany
Expatriate footballers in the Netherlands
Expatriate footballers in Germany
Footballers from Lombardy
Sportspeople from the Province of Monza e Brianza